John Bridgeman Simpson (13 May 1763 – 5 June 1850) of Babworth Hall, Nottinghamshire was born John Bridgeman, a younger son of Sir Henry Bridgeman, later 1st Baron Bridgeman.  He assumed the surname and arms of Simpson by Act of Parliament.

He served as Member of Parliament for Wenlock from 1784 to 1785 (resigned) and again from 1794 to 1820. He was selected High Sheriff of Nottinghamshire for 1794–95 and on 29 March 1797 was appointed lieutenant-colonel of the Derbyshire Militia.

On 3 June 1784 he married Henrietta, daughter of Sir Thomas Worsley. After she died in 1791 he married Grace, daughter of Samuel Estwicke on 27 November 1793.

References

Burkes Peerage and Baronetage (1939 edition), s.v Bradford, Earl.  

1763 births
1850 deaths
John
British Militia officers
Members of the Parliament of Great Britain for English constituencies
British MPs 1784–1790
British MPs 1790–1796
British MPs 1796–1800
Members of the Parliament of the United Kingdom for English constituencies
UK MPs 1801–1802
UK MPs 1802–1806
UK MPs 1806–1807
UK MPs 1807–1812
UK MPs 1812–1818
UK MPs 1818–1820
High Sheriffs of Nottinghamshire
Younger sons of barons